Eleanor K. Baum (born 1940) is an American electrical engineer and educator. In 1984, she became the first female dean of an engineering school in the United States, at Pratt Institute in Brooklyn, New York.

Now retired, in 1987 she was made dean of the Albert Nerken School of Engineering at Cooper Union. She was also the first woman president of the American Society for Engineering Education (ASEE), and has served as president of Accreditation Board for Engineering and Technology (ABET).

Early life and family
She was born in 1940, an only child. Her parents left Europe during the Holocaust and moved to the United States where they urged her to become an elementary schoolteacher, or, as a secondary option, a high school math teacher. As she was growing up, her parents would hide articles with themes of "the joys of being a schoolteacher" under her pillow. Baum considered herself "one of [the] really good kids," who did what they were told. She has stated that because she was an only child, all of her parents’ hopes and dreams were centered on her, so she felt obligated to behave.

According to Baum, engineering was her "big rebellion". When she told her mother about her career choice, her mother said, "You can’t do that. People will think you’re weird, and no one will marry you."

Education
She attended Midwood High School in Brooklyn, New York where she excelled in advanced science and mathematics classes. Although there were a few other girls in her advanced chemistry classes, Baum was the only girl in her advanced physics and advanced mathematics classes. Engineering was dominated by men which, in addition to her adolescent rebellion, influenced her to choose it.

Baum was met with resistance upon applying to engineering colleges: Her high school teachers were discouraging and balked in a similar way that her mother did. One of the engineering schools she applied to would not admit her because it did not have a sufficient ladies' room.

After initial resistance, she was finally accepted to the City College of New York. She graduated in 1958 as the only woman in her engineering class. Baum said, "Being the only girl in college classes was not wonderful... you become all women. If I don’t know something, then it’s 'all women can’t'..." Privacy was also an issue; fellow students were particularly interested in her grades. In 1964, she earned her Ph.D from the Polytechnic Institute of New York (now New York University Tandon School of Engineering).

Career
After graduating from the City College of New York, she worked at the Sperry Rand Corporation and General Instrument Corporation, both of the aerospace industry. Baum maintained ties to industry through consulting.

In 1984, Baum was named dean of Pratt Institute's School of Engineering in New York, a distinctive role because it made her the first woman dean of an engineering school in the United States. Three years later, she became dean of the Albert Nerken School of Engineering at Cooper Union, and is now dean emeritus.

Societies
Baum is a fellow of the Accreditation Board for Engineering and Technology (ABET), the Institute of Electrical and Electronics Engineers (IEEE), the Society of Women Engineers (SWE), and the American Society for Engineering Education (ASEE). She is the first woman president of the ASEE. She has served as president of ABET and sat on the National Science Foundation's Engineering Advisory Board. She was involved with the Engineering Manpower Commission.

Awards
In 1988, the National Women's Hall of Fame presented Baum with the Emily Warren Roebling Award. In 1990, the Society of Women Engineers awarded her the SWE Upward Mobility Award. In 1996, Dr. Baum was inducted into the Women in Technology International Hall of Fame.  In 2007, she was inducted into the National Women's Hall of Fame.

Personal life
She is married to physicist Dr. Paul Baum and has two daughters.

See also
Sukumar Brahma
Johan H. Enslin

References

External links
Eleanor K. Baum via National Women's Hall of Fame

1940 births
Living people
American electrical engineers
American women engineers
Polytechnic Institute of New York University alumni
Cooper Union faculty
City College of New York alumni
Fellow Members of the IEEE
Fellows of the American Society for Engineering Education